
Rock art in Denmark differs significantly from that of the Scandinavian peninsula. Carvings are smaller, focused on agriculture, rarely figural. Some examples are engraved on megaliths or cists, but most on small glacial erratics. Many of these have been placed in museums or incorporated into churches (Asnæs near Kalundborg, Såby near Roskilde, Sigersted near Ringsted - all in Zealand - and Taps in Kolding). A few have been left in situ, like the two stones at Mandbjerghøj.

The repertoire of images of these carvings includes raised hands,  (individuals and pairs), wheels, sun crosses, and spirals, as well as ships. In addition to these, there are also some abstract or unclear images. The majority of the images are associated with cup and ring marks.

Bornholm 
On Bornholm, which in prehistoric times belonged more to the Swedish cultural sphere, there are numerous large carvings on cliff faces - mostly of ships. There are also noteworthy petroglyphs at Blåholt, and Storløkkebakken.

Bibliography
 Peter Vilhelm Glob: Helleristninger i Danmark (= Jysk Arkæologisk Selskabs skrifter. Vol. 7). Jysk Arkæologisk Selskab, Højbjerg 1969.

See also 
 Rock art in Sweden

External links
 Images of stones with rock art
 Helleristninger of the Bronze Age pdf-File

!
Prehistory of Denmark
Archaeology of Denmark